The Inga people are an indigenous ethnic group from the Southwest region of Colombia with a historical relation to the Incas.

They speak a dialect of Quechua known as Inga Kichwa. Almost all Inga people are bilingual in Inga and Spanish, which has caused fear that the Inga language might be an endangered language.

Many today live traditionally in Sibundoy Valley.

Francisco Tandioy Jansasoy is currently involved in the creation of an Inga–Spanish–English dictionary and accompanying pedagogic tri-lingual material for its use in universities and in the Inga-speaking communities of Colombia. There has been significant linguistic and anthropological work done in the past 30 years pertaining to the Inga peoples.

References

Indigenous peoples of the Andes
Indigenous peoples in Colombia